Zoe McCracken is a  Fijian beauty pageant titleholder who was crowned as Miss Earth Fiji 2014  and will compete in Miss Earth 2014 to be held on 29 November at Manila, Philippines.

Pageantry

Miss Earth Fiji 2014
Zoe won the title of Miss Earth Fiji 2014 becoming Esther Cheyanne Foss's successor. There was no Fijian representative in Miss Earth 2013.

Miss Earth 2014
By winning Miss Earth Fiji, Zoe will fly to the Philippines in November to compete with almost 100 other candidates to be Alyz Henrich's successor as Miss Earth.

External links
Miss Earth Official Website

Fijian beauty pageant winners
Living people
Miss Earth 2014 contestants
Year of birth missing (living people)